Corymbia citriodora, commonly known as lemon-scented gum and other common names, is a species of tall tree that is endemic to north-eastern Australia. It has smooth white to pink bark, narrow lance-shaped to curved adult leaves, flower buds in groups of three, white flowers and urn-shaped or barrel-shaped fruit.

Description
It has smooth, pale, uniform or slightly mottled, white to pink or coppery bark that is shed in thin flakes. Flowering occurs in most months and the flowers are white.

Taxonomy and naming
Lemon-scented gum was first formally described in 1848 by William Jackson Hooker who gave it the name Eucalyptus citriodora in Thomas Mitchell's Journal of an Expedition into the Interior of Tropical Australia. In 1995 Ken Hill and Lawrie Johnson changed the name from Eucalyptus citriodora to Corymbia citriodora. The specific epithet (citriodora) is Latin, meaning "lemon-scented".

Lemon-scented gum is also commonly known as citron scented gum, citron-scented gum, lemon gum, lemon scented gum, lemonscented gum, spotted gum and lemon eucalyptus.

Corymbia citriodora is similar to C. maculata and C. henryi.

Distribution and habitat
Corymbia citriodora grows in undulating country in open forest and woodland in several disjunct areas in Queensland and as far south as Coffs Harbour in New South Wales. In Queensland it is found as far north as Lakeland Downs and Cooktown and as far inland as Hughenden and Chinchilla.

Kings Park in Perth has an avenue of this species planted many years ago, but the species has spread to become an environmental weed in the Sydney and Blue Mountains in New South Wales and in open woodland areas in the south-west of Western Australia.

Some naturalists and conservationists do not recognise the genus Corymbia and still categorise its species within Eucalyptus.

Essential oil
The essential oil of the lemon-scented gum mainly consists of citronellal (80%), produced largely in Brazil and China. Unrefined oil from the lemon eucalyptus tree is used in perfumery, and a refined form of this oil is used in insect repellents, especially against mosquitoes. The refined oil's citronellal content is turned into cis- and trans- isomers of p-menthane-3,8-diol (PMD), a process which occurs naturally as the eucalyptus leaves age. This refined oil, which includes related compounds from the essential corymbia citriodora, is known widely by its registered tradename, "Citrepel" or "Citriodiol", but also by generic names which vary by region: "oil of lemon eucalyptus" or "OLE" (USA); "PMD rich botanic oil" or "PMDRBO" (Europe); "PMD and related oil of lemon eucalyptus compounds" (Canada); Extract of Lemon Eucalyptus (Australia).  Pure PMD is synthesized for commercial production from synthetic citronellal.  Essential oil refined from the leaves of the tree can contain up to 98% citronella content.  The smell of the essential oil can vary, but mostly includes a strong odor comparable alone to citronella oil, with a slight hint of lemon scent.

A study comparing mosquito repellents found that products using the oil of lemon eucalyptus were effective at driving mosquitos away from a human hand.

See also
 List of Corymbia species

References

External links
 
Pacific Island Ecosystems at Risk (PIER): Corymbia citriodora

citriodora
Myrtales of Australia
Flora of Queensland
Ornamental trees
Trees of Australia
Plants described in 1848